The Coroner's Court for east London is located at Queens Road, Walthamstow. The court covers the boroughs of Waltham Forest, Newham, Redbridge, Havering and Barking and Dagenham.

References 

Walthamstow
Coroner's courts in London